Jamides aruensis is a butterfly in the family Lycaenidae. It was described by Arnold Pagenstecher in 1884. It is found in New Guinea and the Aru Islands.

Subspecies
 J. a. aruensis (Aru)
 J. a. ariel (Fruhstorfer, 1915) (Kai Island)
 J. a. gloriel (Hulstaert, 1924) (Kai Island)
 J. a. umbriel (Fruhstorfer, 1915) (Waigeu)
 J. a. poliamus (Fruhstorfer, 1915) (Misool, Salawati, West New Guinea)
 J. a. minor (Rothschild, 1915) (Utakwa)
 J. a. dinawus Tite, 1960 (Papua)

Gallery

References

External links

Jamides Hübner, [1819] at Markku Savela's Lepidoptera and Some Other Life Forms. Retrieved June 3, 2017.

Jamides
Butterflies described in 1884